The 1980 Seattle Mariners season was their fourth since the franchise creation, and ended the season finishing 7th in the American League West with a record of .

Offseason 
 November 1, 1979: Ruppert Jones and Jim Lewis were traded by the Mariners to the New York Yankees for Jim Beattie, Rick Anderson, Juan Beníquez and Jerry Narron.
 December 6, 1979: Rafael Vásquez, Rob Pietroburgo (minors) and a player to be named later were traded by the Mariners to the Cleveland Indians for Ted Cox. The Mariners completed the deal by sending Larry Anderson to the Indians on March 29, 1980.
 December 20, 1979: Willie Horton was signed as a free agent by the Mariners.
 January 11, 1980: 1980 Major League Baseball Draft (Secondary Phase)
Bill Mooneyham was drafted by the Mariners in the 1st round (13th pick), but did not sign.
Dan Firova was drafted by the Mariners in the 2nd round.

Regular season 
 September 30, 1980: While pitching for the Mariners against the Kansas City Royals, Rick Honeycutt taped a thumbtack to his finger to cut the ball. Royals baserunner Willie Wilson spotted the tack from second base. The umpires investigated and not only found the tack, but also a gash in Honeycutt's forehead. Honeycutt was ejected from the game, suspended for 10 games, and fined.

Season standings

Record vs. opponents

Notable transactions 
 April 9, 1980: Dave Heaverlo was selected off waivers by the Mariners from the Oakland Athletics.
 June 14, 1980: Paul Serna was signed by the Mariners as an amateur free agent.
 June 16, 1980: Casey Parsons was purchased by the Mariners from the San Francisco Giants.

Draft picks 
 June 3, 1980: 1980 Major League Baseball Draft
Darnell Coles was drafted by the Mariners in the 1st round (6th pick). Player signed June 13, 1980.
John Moses was drafted by the Mariners in the 16th round.
Ernest Riles was drafted by the Mariners in the 21st round, but did not sign.

Roster

Player stats

Batting

Starters by position 
Note: Pos = Position; G = Games played; AB = At bats; H = Hits; Avg. = Batting average; HR = Home runs; RBI = Runs batted in

Other batters 
Note: G = Games played; AB = At bats; H = Hits; Avg. = Batting average; HR = Home runs; RBI = Runs batted in

Pitching

Starting pitchers 
Note: G = Games pitched; IP = Innings pitched; W = Wins; L = Losses; ERA = Earned run average; SO = Strikeouts

Other pitchers 
Note: G = Games; IP = Innings pitched; W = Wins; L = Losses; ERA = Earned run average; SO = Strikeouts

Relief pitchers 
Note: G = Games pitched; W = Wins; L = Losses; SV = Saves; ERA = Earned run average; SO = Strikeouts

Farm system

LEAGUE CO-CHAMPIONS: Bellingham

Notes

References 
1980 Seattle Mariners at Baseball Reference
1980 Seattle Mariners team page at www.baseball-almanac.com

Seattle Mariners seasons
Seattle Mariners season
Seattle Mariners